NAJ Cosfest, is an annual cosplay event held every year in the month of July at Kohima, Nagaland, India. The two-day festival is organised by the Nagaland Anime Junkies and is one of the biggest cosplay festivals in North East India.

See also 
 List of anime conventions

References

External links 

 @nagaland_anime_junkies on Instagram

Anime conventions
Culture of Kohima